Beasts is a novella by Joyce Carol Oates and was originally published in 2001.

Plot summary

Set in an apparently idyllic New England college town in the 1970s, Beasts is the story of Gillian Brauer, a talented young student obsessed with her charismatic anti-establishment English professor Andre Harrow.

Knowing that other girls preceded her does not deter Gillian from being drawn into the decadent world of Professor Harrow and his wife, Dorcas, the outrageous sculptor of primal totems. Gillian soon tumbles into a nightmare of carnal desire and corrupted sexual innocence.

References

2001 American novels
Novels by Joyce Carol Oates
American novellas
Novels set in the 1970s
Carroll & Graf books